Ngô is a Vietnamese surname, related to the Chinese surnames Ng, Ngo and Wu.

Notable people with the surname Ngô

Ngô Văn Dụ Chairman of the Central Commission for Inspection of the Communist Party of Vietnam from 2011 to 2016
Ngô Xuân Lịch Vietnam's Minister of National Defence and Chief of the General Department of Politics of Vietnam
Ngô Thị Thanh Hằng Vietnamese politician
Ngô Thị Doãn Thanh Chairman of the Hanoi People's Council from 2006 to 2015
Ngô Quang Trưởng, Lieutenant General Army of the Republic of Vietnam (ARVN) 
Ngô Quyền, Emperor of Vietnam in 938, noted for expelling the Chinese
Ngô Bảo Châu, mathematician; Fields Medal winner (2010)
Ngô Sĩ Liên, historian of the Lê dynasty
Ngô Trọng Anh, Vietnamese civil servant
Ngô Thanh Vân, Vietnamese actress
Ngô Thế Linh, Army Colonel of the Republic of Vietnam
Ngô Tự Lập, Vietnamese writer, poet, essayist, translator and songwriter
Ngô Viết Thụ, architect
Ngô Xuân Diệu,  Vietnamese poet
Ngô Văn Chiêu (religious name Ngô Minh Chiêu), first disciple of Đức Cao Đài
Ngô Đình Diệm family
Ngô Đình Diệm
Ngô Đình Nhu
Ngô Đình Khả
Ngô Đình Cẩn
Ngô Đình Luyện
Pierre Martin Ngô Đình Thục, Roman Catholic Archbishop
Ngô Thì Nhậm, Vietnamese scholar and official 
Ngô Ngọc Hưng, Founder and leader of C.A.C, contestant on the Korean survival program I-Land (11th place)
Andy Ngo, American conservative activist and journalist

See also
Ngô dynasty

Vietnamese-language surnames

de:Ngô
vi:Ngô (họ)